Sidetracked is an online and print magazine that aims to capture the experience of adventure travel and extreme sports through personal stories. The magazine was started as a website in 2011 but in 2014 moved into print with a bi-annual journal. Sidetracked also gifts an annual grant to explorers through its adventure fund. Its editor-in-chief is John Summerton; the editor is Alex Roddie; the photo editor is Martin Hartley; other editors are Jenny Tough and Daniel Neilson. Contributing editors include Tom Hill and Kieran Creevy.

References

External links
 
 The Adventure Fund

Online magazines published in the United Kingdom
Sports magazines published in the United Kingdom
Magazines established in 2014
Tourism magazines
Biannual magazines published in the United Kingdom
2014 establishments in the United Kingdom
Magazines published in London